The Benoit Freeman Project is an album by American pianist David Benoit and American guitarist Russ Freeman that was released in 1994 and recorded for the GRP label. The album reached No. 2 on the jazz chart at Billboard magazine. Freeman is the founder and leader of the Rippingtons.

Track listing
All tracks composed by David Benoit and Russ Freeman; except where indicated
"Reunion" (Freeman) – 5:06
"When She Believed in Me" (Kenny Loggins, Benoit, Freeman) – 5:25
"Mediterranean Nights" – 6:57
"Swept Away" – 4:55
"The End of Our Season" – 4:16
"After the Love Has Gone" (David Foster, Jay Graydon, Bill Champlin) – 4:18
"Smartypants" – 5:42
"It's the Thought that Counts" (Benoit) – 6:02
"Mirage" (Freeman) – 5:59
"That's All I Could Say" – 3:17

Personnel 
 David Benoit – acoustic piano (1-10), rhythm arrangements (1-10), string arrangements and conductor (1, 3, 10), horn arrangements (7)
 Russ Freeman – synthesizers (1-5, 7), acoustic guitar (1, 2), electric guitar (1-5, 7, 9), classical guitar (1, 3, 4, 5, 8, 9, 10), rhythm arrangements (1-10), percussion (2, 6), bass (5), additional keyboards (6), guitar (6)
 Nathan East – bass (1-4, 7, 8, 9), vocals (8)
 Abraham Laboriel – bass (6)
 John Robinson – drums (1-4, 7, 8, 9), percussion (8)
 Tony Morales – drums (5)
 Mike Baird – drums (6)
 Steve Reid – percussion (1, 3, 10)
 Dan Higgins – alto saxophone (7)
 Gary Grant – trumpet (7)
 Jerry Hey – flugelhorn (6), trumpet solo (7), horn arrangements (7)
 Kenny Loggins – lead and backing vocals (2)
 Steve George – backing vocals (2)
 Anjani Thomas – backing vocals (2)
 Phil Perry – lead and backing vocals (6)
 Vesta Williams – lead vocals (6)

Orchestra (1, 3 & 10)
 Suzie Katayama – music contractor, music preparation 
 Joel Derouin – concertmaster 
 Chuck Domanico and Arni Egilsson – bass
 Larry Corbett, Stephen Erdody, Suzie Katayama and Daniel Smith – cello
 Robert Becker, Cynthia Morrow, James Ross and Evan Wilson – viola 
 Ron Clark, Bruce Dukov, Charles Everett, Armen Garabedian, Berj Garabedian, Pamela Gates, Endre Granat, Henry Ferber, Peter Kent, Maria Newman and Michele Richards – violin

Production 
 David Benoit – producer
 Russ Freeman – producer, vocal producer (2), overdub recording, guitar recording, additional keyboard recording, mixing
 Dave Grusin – executive producer
 Larry Rosen – executive producer
 Clark Germain – basic track recording, piano and drum recording (5), horns recording (7)
 Terry Nelson – engineer (2)
 Alan Hirshberg – engineer (6), basic track recording (6)
 Jeff Demorest – recording assistant 
 Mark Guilbeault – recording assistant 
 Tim Aller – piano and drum recording assistant (5), assistant engineer (6), horns recording assistant (7)
 Joseph Doughney – post-production recording 
 Michael Landry – post-production recording 
 Carl Griffin – mix assistant 
 Ted Jensen – mastering 
 Andi Howard – album coordinator 
 Cara Bridges – album coordination assistant 
 Michael Pollard – production coordinator 
 Sonny Mediana – production director 
 Sharon Franklin – production direction assistant 
 Andy Baltimore – creative director
 Alba Acevedo – graphic design 
 Dan Serrano – art direction, cover art
 Carl Studna – photography
 The Fitzgerald Hartley Co. – management for David Benoit
 Gardner Howard Ringe Entertainment – management for Russ Freeman 

Studios
 Recorded at Cheyenne Mountain Ranch Studios (Colorado); Ocean Way Recording (Hollywood, CA); 29th Street Studio (Torrance, CA); Santa Barbara Sound Design (Santa Barbara, CA).
 Mixed at Cheyenne Mountain Ranch Studios.
 Mastered at Sterling Sound (New York, NY).

Charts

References

1994 albums
David Benoit (musician) albums
Russ Freeman (guitarist) albums
GRP Records albums